35 Vulpeculae is a single, white-hued star in the northern  constellation of Vulpecula. It is faintly visible to the naked eye with an apparent visual magnitude of 5.39. An annual parallax shift of  provides a distance estimate of about 193 light years. It is moving closer with a heliocentric radial velocity of −8 km/s.

This is an A-type main-sequence star with a stellar classification of A1VmA3, indicating it has the spectrum of an A1 class star with the metal-lines of an A3 star. It is an estimated 212 million years old with a projected rotational velocity of 81 km/s. The star has 2.15 times the mass of the Sun with 1.70 times the Sun's radius. It is radiating 21.6 times the Sun's luminosity from its photosphere at an effective temperature of around 9,622 K.

References

External links
 

A-type main-sequence stars
Vulpecula
Durchmusterung objects
Vulpeculae, 35
204414
105966
8217